Headin' for Danger (also known as Asking for Trouble) is a 1928 American silent Western film directed by Robert N. Bradbury for Film Booking Offices of America (FBO) and commercially released in the United States on December 16, 1928. The film was written by Frank Howard Clark and stars Bob Steele, Jola Mendez and Al Ferguson.

Cast
 Bob Steele as Jimmy Marshall
 Jola Mendez as Chiquita Ramerez 
 Al Ferguson as Edward Thorpe
 Tom B. Forman as Bill Braxton/ El Toro
 Frank Rice as Andy Johnson
 Harry DeRoy as Pedro

See also
 Bob Steele filmography

References

External links
 

1928 films
1928 Western (genre) films
Silent American Western (genre) films
American black-and-white films
Film Booking Offices of America films
Films directed by Robert N. Bradbury
1920s American films